Standard Basketball Club Liège was a Belgian professional basketball club that was based in Liège, Belgium. The club was also known as Standard Golden Ball Liège, for sponsorship reasons. It was the senior men's basketball department of the multi-sports club Royal Standard de Liège. The team was dissolved in 1985.

History
The club, without being a classical force for Belgian basketball, lived its golden era from the mid 60s, until the end of the next decade. In that time, Standard Liège won three national championships and three national cups. From 1969 to 1971, the club proved to be extremely competitive in European-wide competitions.

They reached the semifinals of the 1968–69 FIBA European Champions Cup, and were eliminated from the subsequent finalists Real Madrid. They also made the quarterfinals of the 1969–70 FIBA European Cup Winner's Cup, where they were also eliminated by the subsequent tournament finalists Jeanne d'Arc Vichy. They also made the quarterfinals of the 1970–71 FIBA European Champions Cup, playing in a fairly difficult group, which included two powerhouses of European basketball, CSKA Moscow and Real Madrid, and the most important Bulgarian team, Akademik.

Honours and titles
Total titles: 6

Belgian League (3):
 Champions: 1967–68, 1969–70, 1976–77
Belgian Cup (3): 
 Winners: 1962–63, 1968–69, 1976–77

Women's team
The women's section of the basketball club won the Belgian Cup six times; in 1961, 1962, 1963, 1964, 1967, and 1968.

Defunct basketball teams in Belgium
Basketball teams established in 1959
Basketball teams disestablished in 1985
basketball team